Joan Pau is a Catalan masculine given name. Notable people with the name include:

 Joan Pau Pujol (1570-1626), Catalan composer and organist
 Joan Pau Verdier (born 1947), Catalan singer

See also
 Joan (given name)
 Pau (given name)
 Jean-Paul (disambiguation), French-language equivalent
 John Paul (given name), English-language equivalent
 Juan Pablo, Spanish-language equivalent
 João Paulo (disambiguation), Portuguese-language equivalent

Catalan masculine given names